Regional 1 South East (up until 2022-23 known as London & South East Premier and up until 2016-17 known as National League 3 London & South East)  is a level five league in the English rugby union system. It is one of six leagues at this level.  When this division began in 1987 it was known as London Division 1. The format of the league was changed at the beginning of the 2009–10 season following re-organisation by the Rugby Football Union while the name change from National League 3 to Premier was introduced for the 2017–18 season to make it more obvious that it is a regional league. London & South East Premier is the highest regional rugby union league covering London and south east England.   Following the RFU Adult Competition Review the league was decreased in size from 14 to 12 and the name changed once more.

The twelve teams play home and away matches from September through to March, making a total of twenty-two matches each. The results of the matches contribute points to the league as follows:
    4 points are awarded for a win
    2 points are awarded for a draw
    0 points are awarded for a loss, however
    1 losing (bonus) point is awarded to a team that loses a match by 7 points or fewer
    1 additional (bonus) point is awarded to a team scoring 4 tries or more in a match

The first-placed team at the end of season wins promotion to National League 2 East. Three teams are relegated into a mixture of Regional 2 South East, Regional 2 Anglia and Regional 2 Thames.

2022–23
Six of the twelve teams participated in the 2021-22 competition. They are joined by Shelford, Sudbury, Colchester and Harpenden all promoted from London 1 North together with Medway and Bedford Athletic promoted from London 1 South and Midlands 1 East respectively.  Sutton & Epsom, Maidenhead, Havant, Wimbledon and Brighton were level transferred into Regional 1 South Central.  Teams leaving the division included Dorking, Sevenoaks and North Walsham who were promoted into National League 2 East.  There was no relegation from the league at the end of season 2021-22.

Participating teams

2021–22
Nine of the fourteen teams participated in the 2019-20 competition. They are joined by Sutton & Epsom who were relegated from National League 2 South, along with three promoted sides; Havant, North Walsham and Westcombe Park. Maidenhead who played in South West Premier in 2019-20 were level transferred into London & South East Premier as the nearest club geographically to address an imbalance of teams in the league. Teams leaving the division included Rochford Hundred who were promoted into National League 2 South as champions along with Guernsey Raiders who won the virtual promotion play-off against Weston-super-Mare RFC, while teams relegated from the league included Bedford Athletic (Midlands 1 East), Guildford (London 1 South) and London Irish Wild Geese (London 1 South).

The teams competing in 2021–22 achieved their places in the league based on performances in 2019–20, the 'previous season' column in the table below refers to that season not 2020-21.

Participating teams

Final league table

2020–21
On 30th October the RFU announced  that due to the coronavirus pandemic a decision had been taken to cancel Adult Competitive Leagues (National League 1 and below) for the 2020/21 season meaning London & South East Premier was not contested.

2019–20
Nine of the fourteen teams participated in last season's competition.  They are joined by Guernsey and London Irish Wild Geese who were relegated from National League 2 South, along with three promoted sides; Brighton, Rochford Hundred and Sevenoaks. 
  Teams leaving the division included Sutton & Epsom who were promoted into National League 2 South as champions and Westcliff who won the promotion playoff, while teams relegated from the league included Brentwood, Chingford and Shelford (all London 1 North).

Participating teams

Final league table

On 4 April, the Rugby Football Union confirmed the final table for the season.

2018–19
Nine of the fourteen teams participated in last season's competition.  They are joined by Wimbledon who were relegated from National League 2 South, along with four promoted sides; Bedford Athletic, Brentwood, Chingford and CS Rugby 1863.  Bedford Athletic had initially been promoted into Midlands Premier but were level transferred into London & South East Premier as the nearest club geographically to address an imbalance of teams in the league.  Teams leaving the division included Barnes who were promoted into National League 2 South as champions along with Guernsey who won the promotion playoff, while teams relegated from the league included Southend Saxons (London 1 North), Towcestrians (Midlands 1 East) and Westcombe Park (London 1 South).

Participating teams

Promotion play-off
Each season, the runners-up in the London & South East Premier (National League 3 London & South East) and South West Premier (formerly National League 3 South West) participate in a play-off for the third promotion place to National League 2 South. The team with the best playing record, in this case Westcliff, hosted the match and beat their opponents Barnstaple 44 – 5  to win promotion to National League 2 South for the first time. This was Westcliff's first appearance in the play-offs and Barnstaple's second; in 2016 Barnstaple beat Tonbridge Juddians 31 – 30 at Tonbridge. The home team have won fifteen out of nineteen play-off matches and the south-east team have won the play-off thirteen times.

2017–18
Nine of the fourteen teams participated in last season's competition.  They are joined by Barnes who were relegated from National League 2 South along with three promoted teams Sidcup, Tring and Tunbridge Wells. Tonbridge Juddians were promoted into National League 2 South as champions along with Wimbledon who won the promotion playoff.  Teams relegated from the league included Amersham & Chiltern and Colchester (London 1 North) and Chichester (London 1 South).  To address an imbalance of teams, Towcestrians were level transferred into the league from the Midlands Premier, as they were the nearest team geographically.

Participating teams

Final league table

Promotion play-off
Each season, the runners-up in the London & South East Premier, and South West Premier participate in a play-off for promotion to National League 2 South. The team with the best playing record, in this case Guernsey RFC, hosted the match and beat their opponents Bournemouth 38 – 23 to win promotion.

2016–17
Nine of the fourteen teams participated in last season's competition. They are joined by Dorking and Southend Saxons who were relegated from National 2 South while three promoted teams, Amersham & Chiltern, Guildford and Sutton & Epsom were promoted into the league. London Irish Wild Geese were promoted to National League 2 South as champions while Eton Manor and Gravesend were relegated to London 1 North and London 1 South respectively. Originally, Westcliff were supposed to go down as the 14th placed team, but they were granted a reprieve when East Grinstead (who had finished 3rd) decided to take voluntary relegation, due to the loss of a key sponsor and dropped five leagues to Sussex Spitfire 1. Finally Bracknell were level transferred back to National League 3 South West after just one season to address an imbalance in teams after having finished 11th.

Current results see:- National League 3 London & South East results

Participating teams

Final league table

Promotion play-off
Each season, the runners-up in the National League 3 London and SE, and National League 3 South West participate in a play-off for promotion to National League 2 South. The team with the best playing record, in this case Wimbledon RFC, hosted the match and beat their opponents Dings Crusaders RFC 55 – 5 to win promotion.

2015–16

Participating clubs

 Bracknell (from 3rd (National League 3 South-West)
 Chichester 
 Colchester  (promoted from London 1 North (champions))
 East Grinstead 
 Eton Manor (promoted from London 1 North (play-off))
 Gravesend
 Guernsey

 Hertford 
 London Irish Wild Geese 
 Shelford (relegated from 2014–15 National League 2 South)
 Tonbridge Juddians 
 Westcliff
 Westcombe Park 
 Wimbledon (promoted from London 1 South (champions))

Final league table

Promotion play-off
The runners-up in the National League 3 London and SE, and National League 3 South West participate in a play-off for promotion to National League 2 South. The team with the best playing record, in this case Tonbridge Juddian, host the match and their opponents are Barnstaple. Juddians lost the match 31 – 30 to a penalty in the last minute of the match and will stay in National 3 London and SE for next season.

2014–15

Participating clubs

Amersham & Chiltern (transferred from National 3 South West)
Barnes
Bury St Edmunds
Chichester (promoted from London 1 South)
CS Rugby 1863
East Grinstead
Gravesend (promoted from London 1 South)

Guernsey	
Hertford
London Irish Wild Geese (relegated from National 2 South)
Tonbridge Juddians
Tring
Westcliff (promoted from London 1 North)
Westcombe Park

Final league table

Promotion play-off
The runners-up in the National League 3 London and SE, and National League 3 South West participate in a play-off for promotion to National League 2 South. The team with the best playing record, in this case Exmouth, hosts the match; their opponents were Barnes and the match was played on 25 April 2015. At the end of full-time the match score was 22 – 22, and Barnes scored the only points in extra-time, to win the match 27– 22.

After extra time (80 mins: 22 – 22)

2013–14

Participating clubs

Barking (relegated from National League 2 South)
Barnes
Basingstoke (promoted from London 1 South) 
Bury St Edmunds (promoted from London 1 North)
CS Rugby 1863
Dorking
East Grinstead (promoted from London 1 South) 	
	
Guernsey	
Hertford
Old Elthamians
Thurrock 
Tonbridge Juddians
Tring
Westcombe Park

Final league table

2012–13

Participating clubs

Barnes (relegated from National League 2 South)
Bishop's Stortford
CS Rugby 1863
Dorking
Gravesend
Guernsey (promoted from London 1 South)
Hertford

Old Elthamians (promoted from London 1 South)
Staines
Thurrock (promoted from London 1 North)
Tonbridge Juddians
Tring
Westcliff
Westcombe Park

Results

1 Bishop's Stortford Promoted
2 Dorking
3 Westcombe Park
4 Barnes
5 Tonbridge Juddians

6 Old Elthamians
7 CS Rugby 1863
8 Guernsey 
9 Hertford
10 Tring

11 Thurrock
12 Gravesend Relegated
13 Westcliff Relegated
14 Staines Relegated

2011–12

Participating clubs

Ampthill
Bishop's Stortford
Bracknell
Canterbury (relegated from National League 2 South)
CS Rugby 1863
Dorking
Gravesend

Havant
London Irish Amateur (promoted from London 1 South)
Luton
Staines
Tonbridge Juddian (promoted from London 1 South)
Tring
Westcliff (promoted from London 1 North)

Results

1 Canterbury Promoted
2 Tonbridge Juddian
3 Ampthill Transferred
4 Bishop's Stortford
5 Dorking

6 CS Rugby 1863
7 Tring
8 Staines
9 London Irish Amateur
10 Westcliff

11 Gravesend
12 Bracknell Relegated
13 Luton Relegated
14 Havant Relegated

2010–11

Participating clubs

Ampthill
Barnes (relegated from National League 2 South)
Basingstoke 
Bishop's Stortford
Bracknell
Civil Service (promoted from London 1 North)
Diss

Dorking 
Gravesend (promoted from London 1 South)
Havant 
Hertford 
North Walsham 
Staines (promoted from London 1 North)
Tring

2009–10

Participating clubs
First season as a national league

Basingstoke
Bishop's Stortford
Bracknell
Diss
Dorking
Havant
Haywards Heath

Hertford
Jersey
North Walsham
Old Albanians
Portsmouth
Sutton & Epson
Tring

Original teams
When league rugby began in 1987 this division (known as London 1) contained the following teams:

Dartfordians
Ealing
Esher
Guildford & Godalming
Ipswich
Lewes
Old Gaytonians
Ruislip
Sutton & Epsom
Upper Clapton
United Services Portsmouth

London & South East Premier honours
In the first season of the English rugby union league pyramid, sponsored by Courage, there was four, tier five leagues. These were London Division 1, Midland Division 1, North Division 1 and South West Division 1. In 1987 the geographical area for teams in the south-east of England was known as the London and South East Division and covered the counties of Essex, Hampshire, Kent, Middlesex, Norfolk, Suffolk, Surrey and Sussex. The league was also known as London League 1 and London 1. There were eleven teams in the league and they played each team once, giving each team ten matches. This system prevailed for five seasons, and in 1992–93 the number of teams increased from eleven to thirteen. The following season (1993–94) the league was reorganised and the four tier five leagues became two; National 5 North and National 5 South. After three seasons, in 1996–97, a further reorganisation occurred, and there was a return to four, tier five leagues; with London Division One covering the same area as before. This system prevailed until 2009–10 when the number of teams was increased from twelve to fourteen and renamed National League Three London & South East.  The league name changed once more for the 2017–18, when it was renamed to London & South East Premier.

London Division One (1987–93)
The original London Division One was a tier five league with promotion up to Area League 2 South and relegation down to either London 2 North or London 2 South.

London Division One
The top six teams from London Division One and the top six from South West Division One were combined to create National 5 South. London Division 1 was now the name of a tier six league and was one of two feeder leagues for National 5 South.

London Division One
For the end of the 1995–96 season National 5 South was discontinued and London Division One returned to being a tier five league.  Promotion was up to National 4 South (renamed to National 3 South in 2000–01), while relegation continued to London 2 North and London 2 South.

National League 3 London & SE 
The division was renamed National League 3 London & SE following a restructuring of the national leagues which led to changes at all levels.  It continued as a tier 5 league with promotion to National League 2 South (formerly National 3 South) and relegation to either London 1 North or London 1 South (formerly London 2 North and London 2 South).

London & South East Premier
The division was renamed London & South East Premier in order to make it more obvious that it was a regional league and the pinnacle of the London & South East region.  It continued to be a tier 5 league with promotion to National League 2 South and relegation to London 1 North or London 1 South.

Promotion play-offs
Since season 2000–01 there has been a play-off between the runners-up of London & South East Premier and South West Premier for the third and final promotion place to National League 2 South. The team with the superior league record has home advantage in the tie. At the end of the 2019–20 season the London and south-east teams have been the most successful with thirteen wins to the south-west teams six; and the home team has won promotion on fifteen occasions compared to the away teams four.

Number of league titles

Barnes (2)
Basingstoke (2)
Canterbury (2)
Havant (2)
Barking (1)
Bishop's Stortford (1)
Bury St Edmunds (1)
Camberley (1)
Cambridge (1)
Charlton Park (1)
Dorking (1)
Ealing (1)
Esher (1)
Jersey (1)
London Irish Wild Geese
London Scottish (1)
London Welsh (1)
North Walsham (1)
Norwich (1)
Old Colfeians (1)
Richmond (1)
Rochford Hundred (1)
Sevenoaks (1)
Shelford (1)
Sidcup (1)
Southend (1)
Sutton & Epsom (1)
Tabard
Thurrock (1)
Tonbridge Juddians (1)
Westcombe Park

Notes

See also
 London & SE Division RFU
 English rugby union system
 Rugby union in England

References

 
5
 
Recurring sporting events established in 1987
Sports leagues established in 1987